The 1996 Unitel Canadian Mixed Curling Championship was held January 6-14 at the Charlottetown Curling Club in Charlottetown, Prince Edward Island.

Saskatchewan, skipped by Randy Bryden defeated Ontario, skipped by Rich Moffatt in the final. The game went into an extra end, where Moffatt was heavy with his final shot, giving Saskatchewan the win. The Saskatchewan rink also consisted of Cathy Trowell, Bryden's brother Russ and Trowell's sister, Karen Inglis. It was the province's first championship since 1984, and eighth in total.

Teams
Teams were as follows:

Standings
Final standings

Playoffs

Final
January 14, 6:30pm

References

Canadian Mixed Curling Championship
Curling competitions in Charlottetown
1996 in Canadian curling
1996 in Prince Edward Island
January 1996 sports events in North America